Druga.tv is a Bosnian commercial cable/television channel based in Tuzla, Bosnia and Herzegovina.

References

External links 
 Official website
 Druga.tv in Facebook
 Druga.tv in Twitter

Mass media in Tuzla
Television stations in Bosnia and Herzegovina
Television channels and stations established in 2012